Dystrichothorax australis is a species of ground beetle in the subfamily Psydrinae. It was described by Wilhelm Ferdinand Erichson in 1842.

References

australis
Beetles described in 1842